James Arthur Nettles (born February 15, 1942 in Muncie, Indiana) is a former American football defensive back who played eight seasons in the National Football League for the Philadelphia Eagles and the Los Angeles Rams. He played college football at the University of Wisconsin.

References

1942 births
Living people
Sportspeople from Muncie, Indiana
American football cornerbacks
Philadelphia Eagles players
Los Angeles Rams players
Montreal Alouettes players
Wisconsin Badgers football players